Bernard James Fleming (born 8 January 1937) is a footballer who played as a full back in the Football League for Grimsby Town, Workington and Chester.

References

1937 births
Living people
Footballers from Middlesbrough
Association football fullbacks
English footballers
Grimsby Town F.C. players
Workington A.F.C. players
Chester City F.C. players
Winsford United F.C. players
English Football League players